"We gaan naar Londen" (English: We're going to London) is a Levenslied song by Willy Alberti sung with the Supporters of the Dutch association football club AFC Ajax from Amsterdam which was released on CNR Music in 1971. The song is the A-side to the record "We gaan naar Londen / Een, twee, drie, vier" which was released as a 7"-single. The song was released prospectively regarding the 1971 European Cup Final which was contested at Wembley Stadium in London. Ajax defeated Panathinaikos F.C. from Athens, Greece 2–0 in the final, winning their first of three consecutive European championships.

Willy Alberti also released other records relating to his favorite football club Ajax throughout his career, having released the single "Ajax olé olé olé (je bent mijn glorie)" two years prior.

Chart performance

Netherlands Top 40

Netherlands Single Top 100

References
Footnotes

External links
 Willy Alberti en de Ajax supporters's "We gaan naar Londen" on YouTube
 Willy Alberti en de Ajax supporters's "We gaan naar Londen / Een, twee, drie, vier""release on Discogs

AFC Ajax songs
1971 singles
Dutch pop songs
Dutch-language songs
Songs about London
Football songs and chants
1971 songs